Founded in 1988, Strawdog Theater Company is located in North Center at 1802 W Berenice Avenue.

2015–2016 - Season 28

In a Word
by Lauren Yee
directed by Jess McLeod
D.O.A.
by from the script by Russell Rouse & Clarence Greene
directed and adapted by Elizabeth Lovelady
Once in a Lifetime
by George S. Kauffman and Moss Hart
directed by Damon Kiely

History

Lawrence Novikoff and Paul Engelhardt founded Strawdog Theatre Company in 1988 after performing together in a production of Euripides's Helen.  Strawdog was intended to be a home for a company of actors drawn to a gritty, realistic theater style.    The group took their name from Sam Peckinpah's movie "Straw Dogs" and was founded with the commitment to the ensemble approach, which remains the backbone of Strawdog today .

In 2000, the Company went through a period of restructuring.  Many ensemble members left the Company and new members were recruited.  This personnel change led to a shift in leadership and focus for the ensemble.   Jennifer Avery and Michael Dailey took over as Co-Artistic Directors.  They added many new ensemble members of varying disciplines, restructured the administration of the Company and gradually moved its focus from gritty kitchen sink dramas to a wider range of styles.

In August 2003, the Company hired Nic Dimond, a former ensemble member, to helm the Company as Artistic Director.

Strawdog first garnered national attention when Terry Teachout ("America's Theatre Critic") of The Wall Street Journal named Aristocrats one of the best shows of 2007. The next year, Teachout once again lauded Strawdog for their production of RUR, a rarely seen parable about robots and technology.

Production history

2003–2004 - Season 16
Julius Caesar 
by William Shakespeare
directed by Nic Dimond
(remount at Theatre on the Lake)
Detective Story
by Sidney Kingsley
directed by Shade Murray
Wireless: Programme One
by Gregor Mortis
directed by Gregor Mortis
Merchant of Venice
by William Shakespeare
directed by George Cederquist
Fuddy Meers
by David Lindsay-Abaire
directed by Kimberly Senior

2004–2005 - Season 17
Wireless 2
directed by Gregor Mortis
Puntila and His Man Matti
by Bertold Brecht
directed by Nathan Allan
Wireless 3
directed by James Anthony Zoccoli
Impossible Marriage
by Beth Henley
directed by Eric Wegener
The True Ballad of Fall's Blessings
by Hank Boland
directed by Nic Dimond

2005–2006 - Season 18

Detective Story
Sidney Kingsley
directed by Shade Murray
remount at Theatre on the Lake
Wireless 4
directed by Nic Dimond
Three Sisters
by Anton Chekhov
directed by Kimberly Senior
Wireless 5
The Tooth of Crime (2nd Dance)
by Sam Shepard
directed by Nic Dimond

2006-2007 - Season 19

Three Sisters
by Anton Chekhov
directed by Kimberly Senior
remount at Theatre on the Lake
Marathon '33
by June Havoc
directed by Shade Murray
Radio Theatre 6
by Hank Boland
directed by Jennifer Avery
A Lie of the Mind
by Sam Shepard
directed by Nic Dimond
Radio Theatre 7
by Michael Dailey
directed by Amanda Delheimer

2007–2008 - Season 20

Aristocrats
by Brian Friel
directed by Rick Snyder
Richard III
by William Shakespeare
directed by Nic Dimond
Old Town
by Brett Nevue
directed by Kyle Hamman

2008–2009 - Season 21
RUR
by Karel Čapek
directed by Shade Murray
Cherry Orchard
by Anton Chekhov
directed by Kimberly Senior
Red Noses
by Peter Barnes
directed by Matt Hawkins

2009–2010 - Season 22
St. Crispin's Day
by Matt Pepper
directed by Kevin Christopher Scott
Uncle Vanya
by Anton Chekhov
directed by Kimberly Senior
Good Soul of Szechuan
by Bertold Brecht
directed by Shade Murray

2010–2011 - Season 23
Red Noses (Remounted)
by Peter Barnes
directed by Matt Hawkins
State of the Union
by Howard Lindsay & Russel Crouse
directed by Geoff Button
Master and Margarita
by Mikhail Bulgakov
directed by Louis Contey
Conquest of the Southpole
by Manfred Karge
directed by Kimberly Senior

2011–2012 - Season 24
Old Times
by Harold Pinter
directed by Kimberly Senior
Petrified Forest
by Robert E. Sherwood
directed by Shade Murray
The Duchess of Malfi
by John Webster
directed by Brandon Bruce

2012–2013 - Season 25
Neighborhood 3: Requisition of Doom
by Harold Pinter
directed by Joanie Schultz
Improbable Frequency
Book & Lyrics by Arthur Riordan
Music by Bell Helicopter
Big Love
by Charles Mee
directed by Matt Hawkins

Awards

2008
Old TownAfter Dark Awards
 Outstanding Musical
 Outstanding Original Song/Score
 Misha Fiksel
Outstanding Performance in a Musical or Review
 Kat McDonnellLie of the MindJoseph Jefferson Awards, Non-Equity Wing
 Incidental Music
 Misha Fiksel & Gregor Mortis

2007Marathon '33
Joseph Jefferson Awards, Non-Equity Wing
 Outstanding Ensemble

2005
Three Sisters

Joseph Jefferson Awards, Non-Equity Wing
Best Adaptation
Curt Columbus
Best Scenic Design
Brian Sidney Bembridge
After Dark Awards
Best Overall Technical
Best Production

Board of directors
Meaghan Clayton
Thomas Linguanti
Camille McLeod
Jennifer Nelson
Seth Rickard
Chelsea Wilson
Patrick Zubrod

Artistic Associates
Matt Hawkins

Members
Aly Renee Amidei
Hank Boland
Nicole Bloomsmith
Brittany Dee Bodley
Mike Dailey
Scott Danielson
Anita Deely
Paul Fagen
John Ferrick
Kyle Gibson
Sarah Goeden
Carmine J. Grisolia
Kyle Hamman
Heath Hays
Shannon Hoag
Sam Hubbard
Jordan Kardasz
John Kelly
Anderson Lawfer
Sean Mallary
Kat McDonnell
Mike Mroch
Janice O'Neill
Michaela Petro
John Henry Roberts
Jamie Vann
Justine C. Turner

References

 Strawdog Theatre Company website
 New City Stage
 TimeOut Chicago

Theatre companies in Chicago